Andrea Detwiler is an accomplished costume designer. On April 28, 2006, Detwiler won an Emmy Award in the category of outstanding achievement in costume design/styling for her work on PBSs Sesame Street.

Education
She is a 1991 graduate of Virginia Commonwealth University in Richmond, Virginia.

Information
She currently is in England working on the new Muppet movie.

References

American costume designers
Year of birth missing (living people)
Living people
American puppeteers